Combating Corruption is a Federal law of the Russian Federation that took effect on January 10, 2009. It establishes basic principles of combating corruption as well as the legal and organizational frameworks for preventing and fighting corruption. The law also seeks to minimize the consequences of corrupt offenses.

Corruption is defined as the illegal use of an official's position contrary to the legitimate interests of society and the state, combined with obtaining or illegal provision of benefits to the official.

Among the anti-corruption measures are elimination of unjustified prohibitions and restrictions, especially in the area of economic activity, higher wages as well as sotsgaranty for state and municipal employees, the establishment of mechanisms of public control over the work of government, anti-corruption propaganda, ensuring media independence, tightening requirements for civil servants and others.

The law requires civil servants to inform their employer, the prosecutor's office or other state bodies of all bribe attempts. In addition, civil servants are obliged to declare their income and wealth (the list of declared income and assets) and the income and property of the spouse and minor children. In order to prevent conflicts of interest, civil servants holding securities or shares (including participation interests) need to transfer them to trust management.

See also
 Russian anti-corruption campaign

Corruption in Russia